Robert "Waddy" Wachtel (born May 24, 1947) is an American musician, composer and record producer, most notable for his guitar work. Wachtel has worked as session musician for other artists such as Linda Ronstadt, Stevie Nicks, Kim Carnes, Randy Newman, Keith Richards, The Rolling Stones (lead guitar on "Saint of Me"), Jon Bon Jovi, James Taylor, Iggy Pop, Warren Zevon, Bryan Ferry, Michael Sweet, Jackson Browne, and Andrew Gold, both in the studio and live.

Early years
Wachtel was born May 24, 1947, in Jackson Heights in the New York City borough of Queens. At about age 9–10, Wachtel began to learn to play the guitar, taking lessons with teacher Gene Dell (who insisted that he learn to play right-handed despite being naturally left-handed) until about age 14. At that age, he says, he began writing songs.

Wachtel also studied with Rudolph Schramm, who was the head of the NBC staff orchestra and went on to teach music at Carnegie Hall. Schramm tried to get Wachtel to take piano lessons, but Wachtel was intent on playing guitar so Schramm agreed to give him guitar lessons three times a week on rhythm, melody and harmony.

After performing with local bands in the New York area, Wachtel formed his own band, The Orphans, who played in Connecticut and New Hampshire. Eventually the band settled into a regular bar band routine, playing in Newport, Rhode Island, where Wachtel took lessons from Sal Salvador. When the Orphans disbanded, he formed another band, Twice Nicely. At the suggestion of Bud Cowsill (of The Cowsills), he brought Twice Nicely to Los Angeles in 1968 where they recorded a few demos, but after two years, Wachtel decided to work as a session player.

Films
In 1972, he made an appearance in the film The Poseidon Adventure as the acoustic guitar player in a fictitious band on stage in the dining room when the ship capsizes.  
He also played in the Oscar-winning short film, "Session Man" in 1991.
Wachtel has composed and played instruments for film scores including Joe Dirt, Up in Smoke, Nice Guys Sleep Alone, The Longest Yard, The Benchwarmers, Grandma's Boy, Dickie Roberts: Former Child Star, Strange Wilderness, The House Bunny, and Paul Blart: Mall Cop. He has also composed, produced, or performed in songs with Warren Zevon, Joe Walsh, Jackson Browne, Linda Ronstadt and others.

Session and touring work
In 1972, he was hired by Warren Zevon to play guitar on The Everly Brothers' Stories We Could Tell album and join them in a subsequent tour.

By 1973, he played with Lindsey Buckingham and Stevie Nicks on their first album Buckingham Nicks (credited as 'Waddy', no surname), and on tour. Later, when Nicks and Buckingham joined Fleetwood Mac, he played rhythm guitar on their 1975 album Fleetwood Mac on the track "Sugar Daddy".

In 1980, he wrote, recorded and sang lead vocals on an album for producer Peter Asher with members of Linda Ronstadt's band, including musicians Don Grolnick, Dan Dugmore, Stanley Sheldon and Rick Marotta. Both the group and the album were titled Ronin. Released on the Mercury label, the record never charted.

In 1984, he played on Steve Perry's (Journey) solo album Street Talk.

He has appeared on hundreds of albums with many different artists and bands.

Production credits include albums by Stevie Nicks, Keith Richards, Jackson Browne, Bryan Ferry, The Church, Sand Rubies, George Thorogood and the Destroyers and Warren Zevon. Wachtel co-wrote several songs with Zevon including "Werewolves of London". He also co-wrote the Warren Zevon song "Things to Do in Denver When You're Dead" from the album Mr. Bad Example. He performed on all seven Warren Zevon albums from 1976 through 1992, producing or co-producing three.

Wachtel also shares co-writing credits with Stevie Nicks on a few tracks such as "Annabel Lee", and "I Don't Care".

Wachtel has been credited on some albums as Bob Wachtel, but some online sources have incorrectly credited him as Richard Wachtel on albums on which he was credited as having played guitar.

Legal problems
Wachtel was arrested in 1998 on suspicion of possession of child pornography after images were found on a computer he had at home. Wachtel pleaded no contest and was placed on probation for three years.

Musician Brett Tuggle defended Wachtel saying "there is no way that Stevie would have him in her band if she thought he was guilty of any wrongdoing." A detective of the Los Angeles juvenile sex crimes division reported that Wachtel produced copies of the computer-stored images which he kept in his bedroom.

Equipment
Wachtel plays a 1960 Gibson Les Paul and 1957 Fender Stratocaster. He said in a 1980 interview that the newest made guitar he owned was a 1964 Fender Stratocaster. Wachtel purchased the Les Paul guitar from Stephen Stills for $350. In September 2014 the Gibson Custom Shop chose the 1960 Les Paul Waddy Wachtel guitar for their new Collector's Choice series.

2000 to present
Wachtel performs regularly with the Waddy Wachtel Band in the Los Angeles area, notably at The Joint from 2000 through 2013. The band at that time included Phil Jones, Rick Rosas, Bernard Fowler and Blondie Chaplin, among others. He continues to gig with his band, with some personnel changes, while retaining Fowler and Chaplin. Many famous artists have performed with the band as special guests.

Wachtel appeared on the 2010 Grammy Award television show backing Taylor Swift's live presentation. In Swift's duet with Nicks on the song "Rhiannon", Wachtel was featured on lead guitar.

As of 2020, Wachtel is performing with a group of other Southern California classic rock veterans in a group called "The Immediate Family" along with Danny Kortchmar, Leland Sklar, Russ Kunkel, and Steve Postell.

Collaborations
With Bill Cowsill
 Nervous Breakthrough (MGM Records, 1970)

With Lindsey Buckingham and Stevie Nicks  
 Buckingham Nicks (Polydor, 1973)

With Sarah Kernochan
 Best Around the Bush (RCA Records, 1974)

With Jackie DeShannon
 New Arrangement (Columbia Records, 1975)

With John Stewart
 Wingless Angels (RCA Records, 1975)

With Dianne Brooks
 Back Stairs in My Life (Reprise Records, 1976)

With Barbi Benton
 Something New (Polydor Records, 1976)

With Jackson Browne
 The Pretender (Asylum Records, 1976)
 Lives in the Balance (Asylum Records, 1986)
 I'm Alive (Elektra Records, 1993)
 Looking East (Elektra Records, 1996)
 Downhill from Everywhere (Inside Recordings, 2021)

With Andrew Gold
 What's Wrong with This Picture? (Asylum Records, 1976)
 All This and Heaven Too (Asylum Records, 1977)
 Whirlwind (Asylum Records, 1980)

With Arlo Guthrie
 Amigo (Reprise Records, 1976)

With Carole King
 Thoroughbred (A&M Records, 1976)

With Tom Pacheco
 The Outsider (RCA Records, 1976)

With Tom Snow
 Tom Snow (Capitol Records, 1976)

With Maria Muldaur
 Sweet Harmony (Reprise Records, 1976)

With Linda Ronstadt
 Hasten Down the Wind (Asylum Records, 1976)
 Simple Dreams (Asylum Records, 1977)
 Living in the USA (Asylum Records, 1978)
 Get Closer (Asylum Records, 1982)
 We Ran (Elektra Records, 1998)

With J. D. Souther
 Black Rose (Asylum Records, 1976)
 You're Only Lonely (Columbia Records, 1979)
 Home By Dawn (Warner Bros. Records, 1984)

With James Taylor
 In the Pocket (Rhino Records, 1976)
 Flag (Columbia Records, 1980)
 Dad Loves His Work (Columbia Records, 1981)

With Wendy Waldman
 The Main Refrain (Warner Bros. Records, 1976)

With Sammy Walker
 Sammy Walker (Warner Bros. Records, 1976)

With Nickey Barclay
 Diamond in a Junkyard (Ariola America, 1976)

With Rusty Wier
 Black Hat Saloon (Columbia Records, 1976)
 Stacked Deck (Columbia Records, 1977)

With Warren Zevon
 Warren Zevon (Asylum Records, 1976)
 Excitable Boy (Asylum Records, 1978)
 Bad Luck Streak in Dancing School (Elektra Records, 1980)
 The Envoy (Asylum Records, 1982)
 Sentimental Hygiene (Virgin Records, 1987)
 Transverse City (Virgin Records, 1989)
 Mr. Bad Example (Giant, 1991)

With Karla Bonoff
 Karla Bonoff (Columbia Records, 1977)
 Restless Nights (Columbia Records, 1979)
 Wild Heart of the Young (Columbia Records, 1982)

With Nancy Shanks
 Nancy Shanx (United Artists Records, 1977)

With Randy Newman
 Little Criminals (Reprise Records, 1977)
 Born Again (Reprise Records, 1979)
 Trouble in Paradise (Reprise Records, 1983)
 Randy Newman's Faust (Reprise Records, 1995)

With Bryan Ferry
 The Bride Stripped Bare (EG Records, 1978)

With Leo Sayer
 Leo Sayer (Chrysalis Records, 1978)

With Debby Boone
 Debby Boone (Capitol Records, 1979)

With Richie Furay
 I Still Have Dreams (Asylum Records, 1979)
 In The Country (BMG, 2022)

With Adam Mitchell
 Redhead in Trouble (Warner Bros. Records, 1979)

With Ronnie Hawkins
 The Hawk (United Artists Records, 1979)

With Louise Goffin
 Kid Blue (Asylum Records, 1979)
 Louise Goffin (Asylum Records, 1981)

With Bonnie Raitt
 The Glow (Warner Bros. Records, 1979)

With America
 Alibi (Capitol Records, 1980)

With Kim Carnes
 Mistaken Identity (EMI, 1981)
 Voyeur (EMI, 1982)
 Café Racers (EMI, 1983)
 Barking at Airplanes (EMI, 1985)
 Light House (EMI, 1986)

With Rita Coolidge
 Heartbreak Radio (A&M Records, 1981)

With Stevie Nicks
 Bella Donna (Atco Records, 1981)
 The Wild Heart (Modern Records, 1983)
 Rock a Little (Modern Records, 1985)
 The Other Side of the Mirror (Modern Records, 1989)
 Street Angel (Modern Records, 1994)
 Trouble in Shangri-La (Reprise Records, 2001)
 In Your Dreams (Reprise Records, 2011)
 24 Karat Gold: Songs from the Vault (Reprise Records, 2014)

With Helen Reddy
 Play Me Out (MCA Records, 1981)

With Phoebe Snow
 Rock Away (Mirage, 1981)

With Ronnie Wood
 1234 (Columbia Records, 1981)
 I Feel Like Playing (Eagle Rock Entertainment, 2010)

With Don Henley
 I Can't Stand Still (Asylum Records, 1982)
 The End of the Innocence (Geffen, 1989)

With Kenny Rogers
 Love Will Turn You Around (Liberty Records, 1982)

With Bob Seger
 The Distance (Capitol Records, 1982)
 The Fire Inside (Capitol Records, 1991)

With Bette Midler
 No Frills (Atlantic Records, 1983)

With Marty Balin
 Lucky (EMI, 1983)

With Ringo Starr
 Old Wave (RCA Records, 1983)
 Time Takes Time (Private Music, 1992)

With Joe Walsh
 You Bought It – You Name It (Warner Bros. Records, 1983)
 The Confessor (Warner Bros. Records, 1985)
 Ordinary Average Guy (Epic Records, 1991)

With Dolly Parton
 The Great Pretender (RCA Records, 1984)
 Rainbow (Columbia Records, 1987)

With Steve Perry
 Street Talk (Columbia Records, 1984)

With Eric Martin
 Eric Martin (Capitol Records, 1985)

With Jimmy Barnes
 For the Working Class Man (Mushroom Records, 1985)

With Rosanne Cash
 Rhythm & Romance (Columbia Records, 1985)

With Graham Nash
 Innocent Eyes (Atlantic Records, 1986)

With Karla DeVito
 Wake 'Em Up In Tokyo (A&M Records, 1986)

With Van Stephenson
 Suspicious Heart (MCA Records, 1986)

With Dwight Twilley
 Wild Dogs (CBS Records, 1986)

With Cher
 Cher (Geffen, 1987)
 Heart of Stone (Geffen, 1989)

With Lisa Hartman Black
 'Til My Heart Stops (Atlantic Records, 1987)

With Melissa Etheridge
 Melissa Etheridge (Island Records, 1988)
 Brave and Crazy (Island Records, 1989)
 Yes I Am (Island Records, 1993)

With Ivan Neville
 If My Ancestors Could See Me Now (Polydor Records, 1988)
 Saturday Morning Music (UpTop Entertainment, 2002)
 Scrape (Evangeline Recorded Works, 2004)

With Keith Richards
 Talk Is Cheap (Virgin Records, 1988)
 Main Offender (Virgin Records, 1992)
 Crosseyed Heart (Republic Records, 2015)

With Feargal Sharkey
 Wish (Virgin Records, 1988)

With Jon Bon Jovi
 Blaze of Glory (Columbia Records, 1990)

With Bob Dylan
 Under the Red Sky (Columbia Records, 1990)

With Iggy Pop
 Brick by Brick (Virgin Records, 1990)

With Hall & Oates
 Change of Season (Arista Records, 1990)

With Diana Ross
 The Force Behind the Power (Motown Records, 1991)

With Rod Stewart
 Vagabond Heart (Warner Bros. Records, 1991)

With Troy Newman
 Gypsy Moon (Warner Bros. Records, 1991)
 It's Like This (Mega Pop Records, 1995)

With Bonnie Tyler
 Bitterblue (Hansa Records, 1991)

With Tracy Chapman
 Matters of the Heart (Elektra Records, 1992)

With Neil Diamond
 The Christmas Album (Columbia Records, 1992)
 The Christmas Album, Volume II (Columbia Records, 1994)

With Hanne Boel
 My Kindred Spirit (Medley Records, 1992)

With Delbert McClinton
 Never Been Rocked Enough (Curb, 1992)

With Tom Waits
 Bone Machine (Island Records, 1992)

With Andrew Strong
 Strong (MCA Records, 1993)

With Gilby Clarke
 Pawnshop Guitars (Virgin Records, 1994)
 The Hangover (Paradigm Records, 1997)

With A. J. Croce
 That's Me in the Bar (Private Music, 1995)

With Colin James
 Bad Habits (Warner Music Canada, 1995)

With Brian Wilson
 I Just Wasn't Made for These Times (MCA Records, 1995)

With Aaron Neville
 The Tattooed Heart (A&M Records, 1995)

With John Prine
 Lost Dogs and Mixed Blessings (Oh Boy Records, 1995)

With Michael Sweet
 Real (Benson, 1995)

With Bee Gees
 Still Waters (Polydor Records, 1997)

With Johnny Rivers
 Last Train to Memphis (Soul City, 1998)
 Reinvention Highway (Collectors' Choice Music, 2004)

With Amanda Marshall
 Tuesday's Child (Epic Records, 1999)

With Janice Robinson
 The Color Within Me (Columbia Records, 1999)

With Kim Richey
 Glimmer (Mercury Records, 1999)

With Shannon McNally
 Jukebox Sparrows (Capitol Records, 2002)

With Robbie Williams
 Escapology (EMI, 2002)
 Intensive Care (Chrysalis Records, 2005)

With Keith Gattis
 Big City Blues (Smith Music Group, 2005)

With Bernard Fowler
 Friends With Privileges (Sony, 2006)
 The Bura (MRI, 2016)

With Radney Foster
 This World We Live In (Dualtone Records, 2006)

With Miranda Lambert
 Crazy Ex-Girlfriend (Columbia Nashville, 2007)

With John Mayer
 Battle Studies (Columbia Records, 2009)

With David Nail
 I'm About to Come Alive (MCA Records, 2009)

With Michael Grimm
 Michael Grimm (Epic Records, 2011)

With Jessie Baylin
 Little Spark (Blonde Rat, 2012)

With LeAnn Rimes
 Spitfire (Curb Records, 2013)
 One Christmas: Chapter 1 (Iconic, 2014)
 God's Work (EverLe, 2022)

With Edie Brickell and Steve Martin
 Love Has Come for You (Rounder Records, 2013)

With Judith Owen
 Ebb & Flow (Twanky Records, 2014)
 Somebody's Child (Twanky Records, 2016)

With Neil Young
 Storytone (Reprise Records, 2014)

With Mindi Abair
 Wild Heart (Heads Up, 2014)

With Pat McGee
 Pat McGee (Pat McGee, 2015)

With Beth Hart
 Fire on the Floor (Provologue Records, 2016)

With Sheryl Crow
 Threads (Big Machine Records, 2019)

With Anders Osborne
 Buddha & The Blues (Back on Dumaine Records, 2019)

With Edgar Winter
 Brother Johnny (Quarto Valley Records, 2022)

Filmography (partial)

Personal
Wachtel is married.

References

External links

  Waddy Wachtel Band Website
 
 
 Waddy Wachtel Interview NAMM Oral History Library (2021)

Record producers from New York (state)
American session musicians
American bandleaders
Slide guitarists
Lead guitarists
People from Queens, New York
1947 births
Living people
American rock guitarists
American male guitarists
Songwriters from New York (state)
Songwriters from California
Guitarists from Los Angeles
Guitarists from New York City
20th-century American guitarists
Record producers from California
20th-century American male musicians
American male songwriters